Thomas Tighe may refer to:
 Thomas Tighe (CEO), American nonprofit chief executive
 Thomas Tighe (MP), Irish politician
 Tommy Tighe, sports radio broadcaster